Aquinillum is a genus in the family of Cerambycidae and tribe of Achrysonini.  It contains a single species, Aquinillum pallidum.

References

Achrysonini
Monotypic Cerambycidae genera